The Behavioral Analysis Unit (BAU) is a department of the Federal Bureau of Investigation's National Center for the Analysis of Violent Crime (NCAVC) that uses behavioral analysts to assist in criminal investigations. The mission of the NCAVC and the BAU is to provide behavioral based investigative and/or operational support by applying case experience, research, and training to complex and time-sensitive crimes, typically involving acts or threats of violence.

History and structure
The Behavioral Analysis Unit was originally called the Behavioral Science Unit. The Behavioral Analysis Unit (BAU) was created in 1985 as part of the National Center for the Analysis of Violent Crime (NCAVC), itself established in 1985.

The IOSS (Investigations & Operations Support Section) is a branch of the FBI's overall CIRG Critical Incident Response Group.  IOSS provides personnel and training to assist in investigations throughout the country, and at US embassies worldwide.  IOSS supports other CIRG groups within the FBI, FBI Headquarters and Field Offices, FBI legal attaches (at embassies abroad), and all US law enforcement agencies.  IOSS is divided into two main sections: the National Center for the Analysis of Violent Crime (NCAVC) and the Operations Support Branch (OSB).

The NCAVC consists of five Behavioral Analysis Units, or "BAU"s:

 Behavioral Analysis Unit 1 (counterterrorism, arson and bombing matters)
 Behavioral Analysis Unit 2 (threats, cyber crime, and public corruption)
 Behavioral Analysis Unit 3 (crimes against children)
 Behavioral Analysis Unit 4 (crimes against adults, ViCAP)
 Behavioral Analysis Unit 5 (research, strategy, and instruction)

The headquarters for the BAU is located in Quantico, Virginia.

The NCAVC also includes the ViCAP.  ViCAP (Violent Criminal Apprehension Program) is a database available as a tool to all law enforcement agencies nationwide.  It compiles facts, statistics, and particular details regarding violent offenses (including rape, assault, and murder), and maintains them in an online database for the purpose of linking a known offender or known offense to previous crimes, victims, or offenders.  It is a pattern database, allowing users to see patterns in M.O., signature, or victimology, helping to tie crimes to offenders and offenders to crimes for the purpose of solving cases involving violence.

The Operations Support Branch (OSB) contains three main units:

 Crisis Management Unit
 Special Events Management Unit
 Rapid Deployment & Technology Unit

Operation

The BAU receives requests for services from federal, state, local, and international law enforcement agencies. Responses to these requests for BAU assistance are facilitated through the network of field NCAVC coordinators. BAU services can consist of on-site case consultations, telephone conference calls, and/or consultations held at the BAU with case investigators.

BAU assistance to law enforcement agencies is provided through the process of "criminal investigative analysis." Criminal investigative analysis is a process of reviewing crimes from both a behavioral and investigative perspective. It involves reviewing and assessing the facts of a criminal act, interpreting offender behavior, and interaction with the victim, as exhibited during the commission of the crime, or as displayed in the crime scene. BAU staff conduct detailed analyses of crimes for the purpose of providing two or more of the following services: crime analysis, investigative suggestions, profiles of unknown offenders, threat analysis, critical incident analysis, interview strategies, major case management, search warrant assistance, prosecution and trial strategies, and expert testimony.
In addition to the above services, the BAU staff produced the Child Abduction Response Plan to assist investigators faced with these investigations. Recently, the BAU released "The School Shooter: A Threat Assessment Perspective"  report to guide school administrators, teachers, parents, and law enforcement in identifying and evaluating threats in schools. The BAU maintains a reference file for experts in various forensic disciplines such as odontology, anthropology, psychiatry, entomology, or pathology.

References in popular culture
The BAU was brought into mainstream culture by television shows such as Criminal Minds, which depict an elite group of "FBI agent profilers" who travel the country assisting local law enforcement on diverse cases.

The CBS weekly drama series Criminal Minds and its spinoff, Criminal Minds: Suspect Behavior both feature the BAU. Thomas Harris' Hannibal Lecter novels and the corresponding films                (Manhunter, The Silence of the Lambs, Hannibal, and Red Dragon) featured the Behavioral Science Unit (BSU), which later created and developed what eventually became known as the BAU. It is also seen in the NBC television show based on the novels, Hannibal, and the CBS television show Clarice. The Law & Order: Special Victims Unit episode "Signature" (season 9, no. 12, January 8, 2008) heavily features a member of the BAU. Additionally, in season 5 of the HBO show The Wire, two detectives visit the BAU team in Quantico for a profile of the "fake" serial killer they are investigating. In October 2017, the Netflix show Mindhunter was released, which details the experiences of two BSU team detectives interviewing inmates with psychological disorders. In August 2017, the Discovery Channel series Manhunt: Unabomber, based on true events, was released. It featured a member of the BAU who helped catch Ted Kaczynski, also known as the Unabomber, through the use of forensic profiling.

Criticism

In order to generate profiles of offenders, members of the BAU use a concept known as psychological profiling. Belief in psychological profiling has often been supported by anecdotal evidence describing BAU profiles as a necessary key to solving a crime. A homeless man in North Carolina, for example, was apprehended after a BAU profile was issued for a case that the local police force had not been able to solve. Although anecdotal evidence such as this abounds in popular media, the concept of psychological profiling has not been empirically proven.

In a number of studies, professional criminal profilers have been compared to other groups such as students, police officers, and clinical psychologists. In order to evaluate these groups, each participant was presented with the details of a previously solved crime. The profile written by the participant was then compared to a profile of the guilty party. In no study did the group of profilers outperform the other groups, and in some studies, they were clearly outperformed by both police officers and chemistry students.

Despite these findings, members of the BAU continue to use psychological profiling. Public confidence in psychological profiling is also high and has been greatly promoted by TV shows such as Criminal Minds. Some forensic psychologists, such as Robert Homant, have also dismissed the previously mentioned studies by stating that they lack external validity as they do not accurately represent the situations in which members of the BAU work.

References

External links
 Critical Incident Response Group (CIRG)—Includes the BAU
 Behavioral Analysis Unit profile (archived version)